James Dalrymple McIver (14 December 1833 – 1 February 1912) was the son of Captain John and Margaret/Dalrymple/McIver.  He married Mary Anne Kelly on December 2, 1862.  He was a graduate of Davidson College in 1859.  He volunteered 1st Confederate Co. in Moore County and rose to captain.  McIver read law, served as county solicitor (prosecutor), and in the North Carolina House of Representatives (1876–1877); was solicitor for the 7th  judicial district (1876–1886); and judge of superior court (1890–1898).  Ruling elder at Carthage Presbyterian Church for many years.

References

North Carolina state court judges
Members of the North Carolina House of Representatives
North Carolina lawyers
1833 births
1912 deaths
19th-century American judges
19th-century American lawyers